Marc Raymond Wilkins  is a Swiss-British film director and screenwriter. His 2016 film Bon Voyage was entered into the 89th Academy Awards. He was chosen as one of the world's top young directors at the “New Directors Showcase” in Cannes, in 2013.

Selected filmography

Director 
 TAKSI MUNICH (1999)
 Twilight (2008) 
 Hotel Pennsylvania (2013)
 Bon Voyage (2016)
 The Saint of the Impossible (2020)

Writer  
 Bon Voyage (2016)
 Twilight (2008)

Producer 
 Twilight (2008)
 Leroy cleans up  (2006)
 Nass (2001)

Awards and nominations
 Bon Voyage
 San Diego International Film Festival - Best Short Film Award
 San Diego International Film Festival - Best Narrative Short Award
 Palm Springs International Festival of Short Films - Best Live Action Short over 15 minutes 
 Jury Prize for best short at the Jozi International Shortfilm Festival 2016, South Africa
 Swiss Film Academy 2017 – Best short film
 The golden knight international short film festival, Golden knight award 2016 
 Hotel Pennsylvania
 Audience Award the Festival Séquence court-métrage Toulous 2013
 Nomination for Best Casting at the Artois Award by the Casting Society of America
 Twilight
 Official selection of the Hof International Film Festival in 2008

References

External links

Swiss film directors
Swiss screenwriters
Male screenwriters
1976 births
Living people